Xenorophidae is an extinct family of odontocetes currently known from the Oligocene of the southeastern US. Known genera of xenorophids include Albertocetus, Archaeodelphis, Cotylocara, Echovenator, Inermorostrum, and Xenorophus.

References

Prehistoric toothed whales
Prehistoric mammal families